The Jats of Balochistan are a tribe of native people found in Balochistan province of Pakistan. They are 10% of the total population of Balochistan. Jat are the fourth largest tribe of Balochistan. They are by profession camel herders. They were known notoriously all over Makran for their evil-living nature. They are gypsies and always are in the tents searching for grazing for their camels.

The main tribes which belong to the Jat sect of native people are Jamali, Rahmani, Birahmani, Babbar, Sanjrani, Raisani, Waswani, Lanjwani, Hoth, and Mir-Jat.

References

Jat tribes
Jat clans of Pakistan
Social groups of Balochistan, Pakistan